Richard Taehoon Lee (born October 29, 1990) is a Canadian professional golfer who plays on the Asian Tour. He played in the 2007 U.S. Open at the age of sixteen. Born in Toronto, Ontario, Canada, he is now a resident of Chandler, Arizona. His father Jeff played professional tournament golf in South Korea and is now a teaching professional.

Amateur career
In 2006, at the age of 15, Lee was the runner-up to Philip Francis at the U.S. Junior Amateur. The result gave him an exemption to sectional qualifying for the U.S. Open the following year. Lee finished as runner-up at his qualifier to earn entry to the 2007 U.S. Open, becoming the second youngest golfer in the 107 year history of the tournament. However, he did not finish the tournament as he injured his wrist in the second round. He finished at +20, and turned professional at the conclusion of the tournament.

Professional career
Lee played on the Nationwide Tour in 2011, but could not retain his card. In 2013, he finished runner-up at qualifying school for both the Asian Tour and the OneAsia Tour, signalling his intention to play full-time on that continent. In March 2014, Lee won for the first time as a professional on the Asian Tour at the Solaire Open with a one shot victory, having been a runner-up the previous year. In September 2017 he had his second win on the Asian Tour, the Shinhan Donghae Open, an event co-sanctioned with the Korean Tour. A final round 66 gave him a one stroke victory over Gavin Green. In April 2019 Lee won again on the Korean Tour, in the DB Insurance Promy Open.

Professional wins (4)

Asian Tour wins (2)

1Co-sanctioned by the Korean Tour

Asian Tour playoff record (0–1)

Korean Tour wins (3)

1Co-sanctioned by the Asian Tour

Results in major championships

WD = withdrew
NT = No tournament due to COVID-19 pandemic
Note: Lee only played in the U.S. Open and The Open Championship.

Results in World Golf Championships

"T" = Tied

References

External links

Canadian male golfers
PGA Tour golfers
Asian Tour golfers
Golfers from Toronto
Golfers from Arizona
Sportspeople from Chandler, Arizona
Canadian emigrants to the United States
Canadian sportspeople of Korean descent
1990 births
Living people
21st-century Canadian people